Bad Self Portraits is the fourth studio album by Lake Street Dive. It was released through Signature Sounds Recordings on February 18, 2014. Although recorded in 2012, the album suffered a delay due to contractual issues which were resolved in October 2013. The band travelled to the Great North Sound Society, a studio situated in an 18th-century farmhouse in rural Maine to record with Sam Kassirer (Josh Ritter). Price described the recording process as 'we went into the studio with no expectations of what people wanted or what kind of album people thought we should make'.

The single of the same name received airplay on adult alternative-formatted radio stations.

Reception

Critical
The album received generally favourable reviews.

Writing for Allmusic, music critic Matt Collar wrote "the album showcases lead singer Rachael Price's resonant, old-school singing, which is still the main reason to listen to Lake Street Dive. Of course, with her band backing her at various times with harmony vocals, jazzy trumpet, crunchy tube guitar riffs, and woody jazz basslines, there's always something rootsy and unexpected happening around her on Bad Self Portraits." Zachary Houle of PopMatters wrote Bad Self Portraits "is a startling record, one that shows the group tightening up its songwriting chops and presenting a much more unified statement, front to back."

Hilary Saunders of Paste Magazine wrote "Lake Street Dive is a group effort and that its core is powerfully impressive, even if this collection of songs is wrapped up in an unnecessarily over-produced package." Annie Galvin of Slant Magazine wrote "Bigger, louder, and more eclectic works well on Bad Self Portraits, but smaller, quieter, and more precise was what made the band's earlier efforts so distinctive. Here's hoping that they find a way to keep varying their sound without detaching too dramatically from their modest but inimitable street-corner roots."

Commercial

The album debuted at  No. 18 on the Billboard 200 albums chart, with around 14,000 copies sold on its first week of release in the US. It also debuted at No. 5 on the Billboard's Rock Albums chart, and No. 2 on the Independent Albums charts. The album has sold 90,000 copies in the US as of January 2016.

Track listing

Personnel
Rachael Price – lead vocals
Mike “McDuck” Olson – guitar, trumpet, trombone, piano and vocals
Bridget Kearney – bass, piano and vocals 
Mike Calabrese – drums, percussion  and vocals 
Sam Kassirer – piano and organ

Technical personnel
Sam Kassirer, assisted by Erik Hischmann – mixing and production
Jeff Lipton, assisted by Maria Rice – mastering at Peerless Mastering, Boston
Robert and Gudrun Cuillo – executive producers

Design
Philip Price  – graphic design
Jarrod McCabe  – photography

Charts

Weekly charts

References

2014 albums
Lake Street Dive albums